The Simion Stoilow Prize is the prize offered by the Romanian Academy for achievements in mathematics. It is named in honor of Simion Stoilow.

The prize is awarded either for a mathematical work or for a cycle of works.
The award consists of 30,000 lei and a diploma. The prize was established in 1963 and is awarded annually. Prizes of the Romanian Academy for a particular year are awarded two years later.

Honorees
Honorees of the Simion Stoilow Prize have included:
 2020: Victor-Daniel Lie
 2019: Marius Ghergu; Bogdan Teodor Udrea
 2018: Iulian Cîmpean
 2017: Aurel Mihai Fulger
 2016: Arghir Dani Zărnescu
 2015: No award
 2014: Florin Ambro
 2013: Petru Jebelean
 2012: George Marinescu
 2011: Dan Timotin
 2010: Laurențiu Leuștean; Mihai Mihăilescu
 2009: Miodrag Iovanov; Sebastian Burciu
 2008: Nicolae Bonciocat; Călin Ambrozie
 2007: Cezar Joița; Bebe Prunaru; Liviu Ignat
 2006: Radu Pantilie
 2005: Eugen Mihăilescu, for the work "Estimates for the stable dimension for holomorphic maps"; Radu Păltânea, for the cycle of works "Approximation theory using positive linear operators"
 2000: Liliana Pavel, for the book Hipergrupuri ("Hypergroups")
 1999: Vicențiu Rădulescu for the work "Boundary value problems for nonlinear elliptic equations and hemivariational inequalities"
 1995: No award
 1994: No award
 1993: No award
 1992: Florin Rădulescu
 1991: Ovidiu Cârjă
 1990: Ștefan Mirică
 1989: Gelu Popescu
 1988: Cornel Pasnicu
 1987: Călin-Ioan Gheorghiu; Titus Petrila
 1986: Vlad Bally; Paltin Ionescu
 1985: Vasile Brânzănescu; Paul Flondor; Dan Polisevschi; Mihai Putinar
 1984: Toma Albu; ; Dan Vuza
 1983: Mircea Puta; Ion Chițescu; Eugen Popa
 1982: Mircea Craioveanu; Mircea Puta
 1981: Lucian Bădescu
 1980: Dumitru Gașpar; Costel Peligrad; Mihai Pimsner; Sorin T. Popa
 1979: Dumitru Motreanu; Dorin Popescu; Ilie Valusescu
 1978: Aurel Bejancu; Gheorghe Micula
 1977: Alexandru Brezuleanu; Nicolae Radu; 
 1976: Zoia Ceaușescu; Ion Cuculescu; Nicolae Popa
 1975: Șerban Strătilă; Elena Stroescu; 
 1974: Ioana Ciorănescu; Dan Pascali; Constantin Vârsan
 1973: Vasile Istrătescu; Ioan Marusciac; ; Veniamin Urseanu
 1972: Bernard Bereanu; Nicolae Pavel; Gustav Peeters; Elena Moldovan Popoviciu
 1971: Nicolae Popescu
 1970: Viorel Barbu; 
 1969: Ion Suciu
 1968: 
 1967: Constantin Apostol
 1966: Dan Burghelea; Cabiria Andreian Cazacu; 
 1965: ; Alexandru Lascu
 1964: ; 
 1963: ;

See also
 List of mathematics awards

References

Prizes of the Romanian Academy
Mathematics awards